Ott Arder (26 February 1950 in Tallinn – 26 June 2004 in Kassari) was an Estonian poet, children's writer and translator. He was also the author of several popular songs and written texts.

From 1990, he was a member of the Estonian Writers' Union. His younger brother, Jaan Arder was a musician.

Arder was found dead on 26 June 2004 on a beach in Kassari near his summer home. The cause of death was an accidental drowning. He was interred at the Siselinna Cemetery in Tallinn.

References

External links
 Ott Arder at Estonian Writers' Online Dictionary

1950 births
2004 deaths
Writers from Tallinn
Estonian male poets
Estonian translators
Accidental deaths in Estonia
Deaths by drowning
20th-century Estonian poets
20th-century translators
20th-century male writers